In the Standard Model of electroweak interactions of particle physics, the weak hypercharge is a quantum number relating the electric charge and the third component of weak isospin. It is frequently denoted  and corresponds to the gauge symmetry U(1).

It is conserved (only terms that are overall weak-hypercharge neutral are allowed in the Lagrangian). However, one of the interactions is with the Higgs field. Since the Higgs field vacuum expectation value is nonzero, particles interact with this field all the time even in vacuum. This changes their weak hypercharge (and weak isospin ). Only a specific combination of them,  (electric charge), is conserved.

Mathematically, weak hypercharge appears similar to the Gell-Mann–Nishijima formula for the hypercharge of strong interactions (which is not conserved in weak interactions and is zero for leptons).

In the electroweak theory SU(2) transformations commute with U(1) transformations by definition and therefore U(1) charges for the elements of the SU(2) doublet (for example lefthanded up and down quarks) have to be equal. This is why U(1) cannot be identified with U(1)em and weak hypercharge has to be introduced.

Weak hypercharge was first introduced by Sheldon Glashow in 1961.

Definition

Weak hypercharge is the generator of the U(1) component of the electroweak gauge group,  and its associated quantum field  mixes with the  electroweak quantum field to produce the observed  gauge boson and the photon of quantum electrodynamics.

The weak hypercharge satisfies the relation

Rearranging, the weak hypercharge can be explicitly defined as:

where "left"- and "right"-handed here are left and right chirality, respectively (distinct from helicity).
The weak hypercharge for an anti-fermion is the opposite of that of the corresponding fermion because the electric charge and the third component of the weak isospin reverse sign under charge conjugation.

The sum of −isospin and +charge is zero for each of the gauge bosons; consequently, all the electroweak gauge bosons have
  

Hypercharge assignments in the Standard Model are determined up to a twofold ambiguity by requiring cancellation of all anomalies.

Alternative half-scale
For convenience,  weak hypercharge is often represented at half-scale, so that

which is equal to just the average electric charge of the particles in the isospin multiplet.

Baryon and lepton number
Weak hypercharge is related to baryon number minus lepton number via:

where X is a conserved quantum number in GUT. Since weak hypercharge is always conserved within the Standard Model and most extensions, this implies that baryon number minus lepton number is also always conserved.

Neutron decay

Hence neutron decay conserves baryon number  and lepton number  separately, so also the difference  is conserved.

Proton decay
Proton decay is a prediction of many grand unification theories.
{| style="border: none; padding-left:3em; text-align:center;"
|- style="height: 2em;"
|    || →   ||  ||   + ||  || 
|- style="height: 2em;"
|  ||  ||  ||  ||   └→   || 
|}

Hence this hypothetical proton decay would conserve , even though it would individually violate conservation of both lepton number and baryon number.

See also
 Standard Model (mathematical formulation)
 weak charge

References
 

Nuclear physics
Standard Model
Electroweak theory

he:היפרמטען חלש